Koli may refer to:

Places
 Koli, Finland, a hill in Finland
 Koli National Park, a national park in Finland
 Koli, Iran (disambiguation), several places in Iran
 Koli Airfield, a former airfield in the South Pacific

Other uses
 Koli people, an ethnic group found predominantly in northern and western India
 Koli language (disambiguation), dialect cluster of Pakistan and India
 Koli (surname), various people with the surname
 Koli Sewabu (born 1975), Fijian rugby union footballer
 KOLI, an FM radio station that serves Wichita Falls, Texas

See also 
 
 Kolli (disambiguation)
 Kol (disambiguation)

Language and nationality disambiguation pages